The Dance of Death World Tour was a concert tour by heavy metal band Iron Maiden in support of their thirteenth studio album, Dance of Death. The group's eighth live record, Death on the Road, was recorded in Dortmund.

The tour was subject to a short number of cancellations, with the band's shows in Wrocław, Rotterdam and Helsinki being postponed while lead vocalist Bruce Dickinson recovered from flu and laryngitis. On top of this, the group's second show in New York was cut short after one audience member dropped a beer on the soundboard, while the final concert was cancelled due to a scheduling conflict.

Set
Throughout the tour, the stage was decorated to look like a medieval castle, with two towers on either side of the runways, featuring Grim Reaper statues and a castle gate between them for the opening song. The stage floor was decorated to look like a twelve-point star, identical to the one featured in the Dance of Death artwork.

The tour was notable for its extensive use of props and other theatrics. Bruce Dickinson would begin "Dance of Death" from a throne on the left podium, wearing a cape and two Venetian masks, and would later sport a Grim Reaper cloak. Paschendale would begin with battlefield sound effects reminiscent of the First World War, during which the road crew, dressed in military uniform, would place dead bodies and barbed wire around the set, and Bruce Dickinson would recite (pre-recorded) the first two stanzas of "Anthem for Doomed Youth" by Wilfred Owen.

A giant Eddie would appear from the back of the set during "Iron Maiden", wearing a cloak and wielding a scythe. The walk-on Eddie would also appear as the Grim Reaper during "The Number of the Beast."

Setlist

Tour dates 

Reference

References

External links
 Official website
 Dance of Death World Tour Dates

2003 concert tours
2004 concert tours
Iron Maiden concert tours